Banksia fuscobractea, commonly known as the dark-bract banksia, is a species of shrub that is endemic to a small area in the south-west of Western Australia. It has prickly, serrated, wedge-shaped leaves, pale yellow and cream-coloured flowers in heads of up to almost two hundred, and three or four egg-shaped follicles in each head.

Description
The flowers are borne on a head containing between 180 and 190 flowers. Each head has only three or four follicles.

Taxonomy and naming
This banksia was first formally described in 1996 by Alex George in the journal Nuytsia and given the name Dryandra fuscobractea from specimens collected in 1986 by Margaret Pieroni near  Gillingarra. In 2007, Austin Mast and Kevin Thiele transferred all the dryandras to the genus Banksia and this species became Banksia fuscobractea. The specific epithet (fuscobractea) is derived from Latin words meaning "dark" and "a bract", referring to the dark coloured involucral bracts.

Distribution and habitat
The dark-bract banksia grows in low kwongan near Gillingarra. In 2008, the population was estimated to have only about 55 mature plants.

Conservation status
Banksia fuscobractea is classified as "critically endangered" under the Australian Government Environment Protection and Biodiversity Conservation Act 1999 and as "Threatened Flora (Declared Rare Flora — Extant)" by the Department of Environment and Conservation (Western Australia) and an Interim Recovery Plan has been prepared. The main threats to the species include road, firebreak and fence maintenance, gravel extraction, weed invasion and farming activities.

References

fuscobractea
Endemic flora of Western Australia
Plants described in 1996
Taxa named by Alex George
Taxa named by Kevin Thiele